Salford Crescent railway station is a railway station in Salford, Greater Manchester, England, opened by British Rail in 1987.

It consists of a single island platform with a ticket office and waiting room.

The station is near the University of Salford, between the Peel Park and Frederick Road Campus.

Salford Crescent is the point of a split in the Manchester-Preston Line, with local services running on to Manchester Victoria and long-distance services going to Manchester Piccadilly (via the 1988 Windsor Link to Ordsall Lane Junction), and is also part of the line between Manchester and Southport, frequently being used as an interchange between the two lines. Manchester North signalling centre was formerly located at the station, prior to its closure in April 2015. Ticket gates have been in operation at the station since 2016.

Services

All services are operated by Northern. As of December 2022, the typical weekday off-peak service is:

Northbound
2tph to 
2tph to 
2tph to  via , with 1tph continuing to 
1tph to 
1tph to 
Southbound
2tph to 
1tph to 
1tph to 
2tph to 
1tph to 
1tph to  via  and 

Engineering work on the heavily delayed Manchester to Preston Line electrification project saw all weekend services here suspended (and replaced by buses) for much of 2017-18 (through trains being diverted via Eccles and the West Coast Main Line) - these blockades continued until November 2018. Electric services commenced on Monday 11 February 2019 utilising Class 319 electric multiple units.

Connecting bus routes
Salford Crescent is served by Stagecoach Manchester's service 50, a cross-city bus service between East Didsbury and MediaCityUK. Services 8, 31, 36, 37, 67 and 100 also stop outside the station and run to Manchester, terminating at either Piccadilly Gardens or Shudehill Interchange. Services also head towards Bolton, Eccles, Swinton, Pendlebury, Trafford Centre, Warrington and Farnworth.

Improvements
In 2007, Network Rail recognised that Salford Crescent could not cope with existing passenger levels, leading to platform overcrowding. It suggested expansion of the station with extra platforms, greater use of it as an interchange and use as a terminus for services from east of Manchester. It also raised the possibility of moving the station.

In 2012, improvement work started at the station, including platform extensions, a new rain canopy and the relocation of the ticket office to street level. The works were completed in October 2013 and officially opened by Mayor of Salford, Ian Stewart.

Electrification

Although it does not include the line via  to Wigan, the main line connecting Manchester stations to Preston and Blackpool passing through Salford Crescent has been electrified. The physical-civil engineering work was hit by a number of delays which delayed its completion by two years. The first electric test trains ran on the night of 13 December 2018, and the first electric passenger services commenced in early February 2019, utilising Class 319 electric multiple units.

Facilities
The station's ticket office is staffed throughout the week (06:30 to 21:45 weekdays and Saturdays, 09:10 to 16:00 on Sundays) and there is a self-service ticket machine in the booking hall.  A waiting room, digital information screens and automated announcements are provided at platform level.  Step-free access is via a lift from the road bridge and ticket hall (there is also a staircase to the platform).

Notes

External links

Railway stations in Salford
DfT Category C2 stations
University of Salford
Railway stations opened by British Rail
Railway stations in Great Britain opened in 1987
Northern franchise railway stations